United Nations Security Council Resolution 116, adopted on June 26, 1956, after examining the application of Tunisia for membership in the United Nations the Council recommended to the General Assembly that the Tunisia be admitted.

The resolution was approved by all 11 members of the Council.

See also
List of United Nations Security Council Resolutions 101 to 200 (1953–1965)

References
Text of the Resolution at undocs.org

External links
 

 0116
 0116
 0116
1956 in Tunisia
June 1956 events